The 1999 Acura Classic doubles was the doubles event of the twentieth edition of the third tournament in the US Open Series. Martina Hingis and Natasha Zvereva were the defending champions but Hingis did not compete this year. Zvereva played with Mary Pierce, and they were defeated in the first time by Cara Black and Irina Selyutina.

Arantxa Sánchez Vicario and Larisa Neiland won the title, defeating third seeds Lisa Raymond and Rennae Stubbs in the final.

Seeds

Draw

Qualifying

Seeds

Qualifiers
  Els Callens /  Debbie Graham

Qualifying draw

References
 

ITF doubles results page

Doubles
Acura Classic - Doubles